Dane Gagai (born 3 January 1991) is a professional rugby league footballer and boxer who plays as a  and er for the Newcastle Knights in the NRL. He has played for Australia and the New Zealand Maori at international level.

He previously played for the Brisbane Broncos and South Sydney Rabbitohs in the National Rugby League. He has played for the Indigenous All Stars, Queensland in the State of Origin series and the Prime Minister's XIII. In 2017 he won the Wally Lewis Medal as State of Origin Player of the Series.

Background
Gagai was born in Mackay, Queensland, Australia. He is of Torres Strait Islander heritage through his father's family (Yam Island and Badu Island people) and Ngati Pikiao Maori descent by way of his mother's ancestry.

Gagai's father, Ray, was a member of the Brisbane Broncos' squad in the 1989 NSWRL season. He is also the cousin of former New Zealand test player Josh Hoffman, former Broncos player Wendell Sailor and former Broncos player Travis Waddell. Gagai was eligible to play for both Australia and New Zealand through parents of Indigenous Australian and Māori.

He played his junior football for Brisbane Wests before being signed by the Brisbane Broncos.

Playing career

Early career
From 2009 to 2011, Gagai played for the Brisbane Broncos' NYC team, scoring 39 tries in 61 games.

2011

Gagai finished his debut year in the NRL with 4 tries in 6 matches.

2012
On 19 March, Gagai re-signed with Brisbane on a two-year contract. On 9 May, he was released from the contract due to disciplinary reasons. On 28 May, Gagai signed a 2-year contract with the Newcastle Knights effective immediately. Gagai finished his first year in the Newcastle Knights with 12 matches and 5 tries.

2013
On 22 May, Gagai re-signed with Newcastle on a two-year contract. he finished the season with 23 matches and scoring 5 tries. In August, Gagai rejected playing for New Zealand in the 2013 Rugby League World Cup, instead setting his sights to play for Queensland in State of Origin.

2014
On 28 January, Gagai was banned from the Queensland Origin camp by Mal Meninga after a discipline breach. In February, Gagai was selected in the Knights inaugural Nines squad. In June, he was included in the Queensland Maroons extended 22-man squad but was later not chosen to make his debut for Queensland. Gagai played in all of the Knights 24 matches, scoring 7 tries and kicking a goal.

2015
In the pre-season, Gagai played for the Knights in the 2015 NRL Auckland Nines and the Indigenous All Stars in the annual All Stars match, playing off the interchange bench. The Indigenous side won 20–6.

On 10 April, he re-signed with Newcastle on a two-year contract after strong interest from his former club Brisbane Broncos. On 8 July, he made his State of Origin debut on the wing for Queensland in Game 3 of the 2015 State of Origin series, scoring the first try of the game, in Queensland's 52–6 win. He finished the 2015 season having played in all of the Knights 24 matches, scoring 7 tries and kicking 2 goals as the club finished last.

On 26 September, he played for the Prime Minister's XIII against Papua New Guinea, playing at centre in his team's 40–12 win in Port Moresby.

2016
On 13 February, Gagai again played for the Indigenous All Stars against the new World All Stars, playing on the wing and scoring a try in his team's 8–12 loss at Suncorp Stadium.

In round 10 against the Cronulla-Sutherland Sharks, Gagai played his 100th NRL career game in the Knights' 0–62 loss at Hunter Stadium. After the match, he was seen on camera crying and being embraced by teammate Tariq Sims. Fox Sports commentators Andrew Voss, Jimmy Smith and Mark Gasnier commented on the incident: "Right there at the finish, I don't think I've ever seen the likes of that in all my time following rugby league," said Voss. "Dane Gagai just couldn't contain himself. This is a round 10 game. Have you ever witnessed that in your life? They were incredible pictures," said Smith. "That is a reaction you just don't see. He was shattered," said Gasnier. After the incident, Gagai was exposed to racial abuse from a crowd member. It was later revealed that Gagai was upset due to the death of his grandmother earlier that day.

He played in all 3 matches for Queensland on the wing in the 2016 State of Origin series, where he scored 1 try in Game 1 in Queensland's 6–4 win at ANZ Stadium and a hat-trick of tries in Game 2 in their 26–16 win at Suncorp Stadium.

He finished the season having played in 22 matches and scoring 3 tries as Newcastle finished last on the table and claimed the wooden spoon for a second consecutive year.

2017
Gagai made his third consecutive appearance for the Indigenous All Stars, starting on the wing and scoring a try in the 34–8 win.

On 10 June, Gagai announced that he signed a four-year deal with the South Sydney Rabbitohs from 2018.

On 12 July, Gagai won the Wally Lewis Medal as the player of the 2017 State of Origin series. Gagai, who played on the wing for Queensland in all 3 games, scored 2 tries in Game 2 in the series-tying 18–16 win at ANZ Stadium and ran for over 500 metres for the series. He became the first winger to win the official Player of the series.

Gagai finished his last year with the Newcastle Knights with him playing in 23 matches and scoring 2 tries as Newcastle finished last for a third consecutive year. On 3 October, he was selected in the 24-man Australia Kangaroos 2017 Rugby League World Cup squad. On 27 October, Gagai made his international debut for Australia against England, playing on the wing in the 18–4 win at AAMI Park. In his next match against Lebanon, Gagai scored his first international try in the 34–0 win at Sydney Football Stadium. Gagai played in 5 matches and scored 3 tries in the tournament including starting on the wing in the Kangaroos gritty 6-0 World Cup Final victory over England at Suncorp Stadium.

2018
In round 1 of the 2018 season, Gagai made his club debut for South Sydney against the New Zealand Warriors, playing at centre in South Sydney's 20–32 loss at Perth Stadium.

In round 9 against his old club Newcastle, he scored his first try for Souths in their 36–18 win at McDonald Jones Stadium. During the 2018 All-Stars match at AAMI Park, Melbourne, Gagai was eligible to play for both representative teams as he had Torres Strait Island and Maori heritage. Gagai was then selected to the Maori All-Stars Team.

2019
Before the 2019 NRL season started Gagai chose to play for New Zealand Maori kiwis against the Indigenous Australian All Stars and in that game he scored two tries.

In Game 1 of the 2019 State of Origin series, Gagai scored 2 tries and won man of the match in Queensland's 18–14 victory at Suncorp Stadium. After the match, Gagai finished with 256 run metres, two linebreaks, three tackle breaks and 11 tackles.
In round 19 against St. George, Gagai scored two tries as South Sydney won the match 20-16 after the final siren had sounded.

Gagai finished the 2019 NRL season playing 25 games and scoring 10 tries.  He played in the club's preliminary final defeat against the Canberra Raiders as the club fell short of a grand final appearance for the second year in a row.

2020
In round 5 of the 2020 NRL season, Gagai scored two tries as South Sydney defeated the Gold Coast 32–12 at Bankwest Stadium.  In round 8, Gagai scored the match winning try for Souths as they defeated Canterbury 26–10 at Bankwest Stadium. In round 9, Gagai scored his first NRL hat trick as Souths defeated the West Tigers 18–10 at Bankwest Stadium.

In round 18 against Wests Tigers, Gagai scored a try but was later sent to the sin bin after throwing the ball at Wests player Luke Brooks.  Brooks retaliated punching Gagai in the face before the pair traded punches sparking an all in brawl.  Souths would go on to win the match 26–24.

Gagai finished the season with 19 appearances and 11 tries.  He played in the club's preliminary final defeat against Penrith as Souths fell at that stage in the competition for a third year in a row.

2021
In round 12 of the 2021 NRL season, Gagai scored a hat-trick in South Sydney's 38-20 victory over Parramatta.
On 9 August, it was announced that Gagai had signed a three-year deal to rejoin Newcastle in 2022.
In round 24, Gagai was sent to the sin bin during South Sydney's 52-12 victory over arch-rivals the Sydney Roosters.
Gagai played a total of 23 games for South Sydney in the 2021 NRL season including the club's 2021 NRL Grand Final defeat against Penrith.

2022
In Game 3 of the 2022 State of Origin series, Gagai was sent to the sin bin for punching New South Wales player Matt Burton during Queensland's 22-12 victory.
In round 19 of the 2022 NRL season, Gagai was sent to the sin bin for dissent during Newcastle's 42-12 loss against the Sydney Roosters. In round 24, Gagai scored two tries for Newcastle in their 26-36 defeat to the Gold Coast.
Gagai played a total of 20 games for Newcastle in 2022 as the club finished 14th on the table.

Accolades 
Wally Lewis Medal: 2017

Career stats

Club

Representative

References

External links
Newcastle Knights profile
South Sydney Rabbitohs profile 

 

1991 births
Living people
Australia national rugby league team players
Australian people of New Zealand descent
Australian people of Māori descent
Australian rugby league players
Brisbane Broncos players
Indigenous All Stars players
Indigenous Australian rugby league players
Junior Kangaroos players
New Zealand Māori rugby league players
New Zealand Māori rugby league team players
Newcastle Knights players
Newcastle Yowies players
People educated at Brisbane Boys' College
Prime Minister's XIII players
Queensland Rugby League State of Origin players
Redcliffe Dolphins players
Rugby league centres
Rugby league fullbacks
Rugby league players from Mackay, Queensland
Rugby league wingers
South Sydney Rabbitohs players
Torres Strait Islanders